Oriflamme may refer to
 Oriflamme, the battle standard of the King of France
 Oriflame, a cosmetic group
 French ship Oriflamme, a French (eventually Spanish) ship, sank off the coast of Chile
 British ship Oriflamme, arrived to San Francisco on 8 January 1876, 257 days from London, via Portsmouth.
 Oriflamme (1906), a Branlebas-class destroyer of the French Navy
 Oriflamme Canyon in the Laguna Mountains of San Diego County, California